Les Sylphides is a short, non-narrative ballet blanc to piano music by Frédéric Chopin,  selected and orchestrated by Alexander Glazunov. 

The ballet, described as a "romantic reverie", is frequently cited as the first ballet to be simply about mood and dance. Les Sylphides has no plot but instead consists of several white-clad sylphs dancing in the moonlight with the "poet" or "young man" dressed in white tights and a black tunic.

Its original choreography was by Michel Fokine, with Chopin's music orchestrated by Alexander Glazunov. Glazunov had already set some of the music in 1892 as a purely orchestral suite, under the title Chopiniana, Op. 46. In that form, it was introduced to the public in December 1893, conducted by Nikolai Rimsky-Korsakov.

Performance history

Identifying the premiere of the fuller ballet poses a challenge. One might say that it premiered in 1907 at the Mariinsky Theatre in Saint Petersburg as Rêverie Romantique: Ballet sur la musique de Chopin. However, this also formed the basis of a ballet, Chopiniana, which took different forms, even in Fokine's hands. As Les Sylphides, what we consider the work was premiered by Sergei Diaghilev's Ballets Russes on 2 June 1909 at Théâtre du Châtelet, Paris. The Diaghilev premiere is the most famous, as its soloists were Tamara Karsavina, Vaslav Nijinsky (as the poet, dreamer, or young man), Anna Pavlova, and Alexandra Baldina. The long white tutu that Pavlova originally danced in, and that the entire female corps de ballet adopted soon after, was designed by Léon Bakst and inspired by a lithograph of Marie Taglioni dressed as a sylph.

The London premiere, in the first season of the Diaghilev Ballets Russes, was at the Royal Opera House. With more sylph-like elusiveness, the North American premiere might be dated by an unauthorized version in the Winter Garden, New York, on 14 June 1911 (featuring Baldina alone from the Diaghilev cast). However, its authorized premiere on that continent, by Diaghilev Ballets Russes, was at the Century Theater, New York City, 20 January 1916, with Lydia Lopokova (who also featured in the unauthorized production five years earlier). Nijinsky danced it with that company at the Metropolitan Opera on 14 April 1916, where it was paired with a similar work to a piano suite (by Robert Schumann), Papillons, also choreographed by Fokine. Fokine also set the ballet for several other companies, and he and his wife, Vera Fokina, danced its leading roles themselves for some years.

Revision history

Original production

Chopiniana, staged by Fokine, had a different musical composition. Also, Chopiniana was originally a compilation of dramatic or character dances set to Chopin's piano music. The Glazunov suite upon which this original version was based had only four Chopin pieces; Fokine wanted to use a waltz as an addition to the suite and was able to get Glazunov to orchestrate this to create his ballet, also called Chopiniana.

 Polonaise in A major, Op. 40, No. 1
 Nocturne in F major, Op. 15, No. 1
 Mazurka in C minor, Op. 50, No. 3
 Waltz in C minor, Op. 64, No. 2, as added by Michel Fokine
 Tarantella in A major, Op. 43

The newly orchestrated waltz would be Fokine's inspiration to re-choreograph the ballet into its nearly-final form, selecting different Chopin pieces to go with it and getting these orchestrated by the Maryinsky répétiteur Maurice Keller.

Ballets Russes production
When Fokine's ballet premiered in Paris as part of Diaghilev's "Saison Russe" in 1909, Diaghilev commissioned re-orchestrations of all the dances, except for the Glazunov-orchestrated Waltz, by Anatoly Lyadov, Sergei Taneyev, Nikolai Tcherepnin and Igor Stravinsky. This version, now titled Les Sylphides, was first staged at the Théâtre du Châtelet on 2 June 1909.

Standard version
The canonical version of the ballet Les Sylphides includes:

 Polonaise in A major (Military), Op. 40, No. 1 (some companies substitute the Prelude in A major, Op. 28, No. 7 instead)
 Nocturne in A major, Op. 32, No. 2
 Waltz in G major, Op. 70, No. 1 (transposed to G major)
 Mazurka in D major, Op. 33, No. 2
 Mazurka in C major, Op. 67, No. 3
 Prelude in A major, Op. 28, No. 7
 Waltz in C minor, Op. 64, No. 2 (transposed to D minor)
 Grande valse brillante in E major, Op. 18 (transposed to D major)

New York City Ballet production

The New York City Ballet (NYCB) produced its own staging of the standard version, omitting the Polonaise in A major (and leaving the Prelude in A major in its original position), under the original title, Chopiniana. The NYCB premiere was staged by Alexandra Danilova and took place 20 January 1972, at the New York State Theater, Lincoln Center. The original cast included Karin von Aroldingen, Susan Hendl, Kay Mazzo, and Peter Martins.

Other orchestrations
A number of musicians have orchestrated the Chopin pieces for major ballet companies, including Maurice Ravel, Benjamin Britten, Alexander Gretchaninov, Roy Douglas, and Gordon Jacob. The Ravel orchestration has been lost. The Britten orchestration was considered lost but a score thought to be his was found in 2013 in the archives of the American Ballet Theatre.

Roy Douglas's version has been recorded a number of times, and has largely supplanted the earlier versions. It was written in 1936, to replace what Douglas called "very bad orchestrations of Chopin's music".

See also
 Classical music written in collaboration

Notes

Sources

External links

Image of Margot Fonteyn performing in Les Sylphides
Les Sylphides, Mozartiana, Amazed in Burning Dreams, November 2004, American Ballet Theatre, performance details
Les Sylphides, Ballet Encyclopedia
Roy Douglas, MusicWeb

Ballets Russes productions
Ballets by Michel Fokine
Ballets designed by Alexandre Benois
New York City Ballet repertory
1909 ballet premieres
Ballets to the music of Frédéric Chopin
Ballets to the music of Alexander Glazunov
Orchestral suites
Arrangements of classical compositions
Sylphs